Stenoterommata tenuistyla is a species of mygalomorph spiders of Argentina, named after the thin, slender embolus in males of this species, which distinguish it from males of the sympatric S. crassistyla. Females are distinguished from other three-clawed Stenoterommata by their spermathecae, which have a short basal portion and a single receptaculum arising from near the tip of the base. Males are diagnosed by one of the species autapomorphies: the presence of numerous short spines on the ventral metatarsus I.

Description
Male: total length ; cephalothorax length , width ; cephalic region length , width ; labium length , width ; sternum length , width . Its labium has no cuspules and serrula are not visible. Its sternal sigilla are small, oval and shallow with its sternum slightly rebordered. Chelicerae: rastellum absent (only weak, attenuate setae). Cheliceral tumescence is present and flat, with the lower half covered with setae. Cephalothorax, legs and palpi are a yellowish-reddish-brown colour; abdomen yellow, with brown chevron.
Female: total length ; cephalothorax length , width ; cephalic region length , width ; fovea width ; labium length , width ; sternum length , width . Its cephalic region is convex, with fovea procurved. Its labium possesses 4 cuspules and no serrula is visible. Its sternal sigilla is small and shallow. Chelicerae: rastellum formed by attenuate setae. Colour as in the male.

Distribution
Entre Ríos and northern Buenos Aires Province.

Behaviour
S. tenuistyla lives in short, branched burrows, lined with a dense layer of silk. The burrows are constructed under rocks or logs, between roots, or in open spaces. In Buenos Aires they have been found in the banks of the Rio Parana, along a stretch of 50 km; north of there, they appear to be replaced by S. crassistyla. In Entre Rios they have been found in mounds around trees. During daytime, the burrows had their entrances closed with silk and debris and were not directly visible.

See also
Spider anatomy
Iguazú National Park

References

Pycnothelidae
Spiders of Argentina
Spiders described in 1995